The Wind is a 1982 Malian drama film directed by Souleymane Cissé. It was screened in the Un Certain Regard section at the 1982 Cannes Film Festival.

Cast
 Fousseyni Sissoko - Bah
 Goundo Guissé - Batrou
 Balla Moussa Keïta - The gouvenor Sangaré
 Ismaila Sarr - Bah's grand-father
 Omou Diarra - The third spouse
 Ismaila Cissé - Seydou
 Massitan Ballo - Bah's mother
 Dioncounda Kone - Bah's grand-mother
 Yacouba Samabaly - La commissaire de police
 Dounamba Dany Coulibaly - The woman Peul
 Oumou Koné

References

External links

1982 films
1982 drama films
Malian drama films
Bambara-language films
Films directed by Souleymane Cissé